Sigma Lambda Alpha Sorority, Inc. is an American Latina based Greek-lettered sorority of college-educated women. Sigma Lambda Alpha Sorority, Inc. was founded in the summer of 1992, at Texas Woman's University in Denton, Texas by Angeles Gonzalez and the help of five other young women.

Sigma Lambda Alpha Sorority, Inc. is a Latina founded organization and is open to all women regardless of race, nationality, or religion.

History 
Sigma Lambda Alpha Sorority, Inc. (ΣΛΑ), otherwise known as Señoritas Latinas en Accion, was founded in the summer of 1992 by Angeles Gonzalez. As a student at Texas Woman’s University, Gonzalez read an article in Hispanic magazine about a national Hispanic sorority. Upon reading this article, she came to the realization that Latina Greek organizations were a cultural median at universities. She became interested in forming an organization that would serve as a cultural outlet on her campus.

Miss Gonzalez wrote to the sorority for more information regarding their organization and Latino Greeks in general. She promptly received a response and was advised to begin an interest group, elect officers and choose an organizational name to start the sorority process. With the assistance of Director Linda Weber in the Office of Student Development and Robin Zaruba, Assistant Director of Activities and Orientation, Angeles Gonzalez began the process of establishing a Latina sorority at Texas Woman’s University.

In the fall of 1992, Miss Gonzalez began recruiting girls to be the “founding mothers” of the sorority and attend the first meeting. In this meeting, they discussed goals of the organization, elected officers and chose their organizational/interest group name. Sigma Lambda Alpha - Señoritas Latinas en Acción was founded on October 20, 1992 on the campus of Texas Woman’s University in Denton, Texas.

With the interest group of Sigma Lambda Alpha established, excitement grew with the thought of having Latina representation at TWU, however the sorority in Pennsylvania decided against beginning a chapter in Texas, because of the distance between the two states. Determined to have Hispanic representation at TWU, the founding mothers did not let this hinder the establishment of an organization. They chose to launch a new sorority based on their original group goals and combined beliefs. They elected to carry on the name of Sigma Lambda Alpha/ Señoritas Latinas en Acción, and created a sisterhood on the basis of cultural awareness, community service, leadership and academic achievement. The first pledge class of the Alpha chapter was inducted in the spring of 1993.

Mission 

The mission of Sigma Lambda Alpha Sorority, Inc. is to promote the importance of community service involvement and academic achievement as well as to educate and excel the stance of Latino cultures in this diversely enriched society.

Chapters 
Active chapters are indicated in bold. Inactive chapters are indicated in italic.

References 

Student societies in the United States
Student organizations established in 1992
Texas Woman's University
Latino fraternities and sororities
1992 establishments in Texas